Calciferous sandstone is a geological term relating to strata at the base of the Carboniferous formation, below the entire sequence of coal measures. This term may be unique to the UK.

Typically this part of the geological sequence, as in the Touch Hills and Fintry Hills to the west of Stirling tends to contain a mixture of lavas and sedimentary rocks, including sandstone and mudstone, and lies unconformably on top of older Devonian strata.

Carboniferous geology